The Ankara Arena, is an indoor sporting arena that is located in Ankara, Turkey that opened in April 2010. The seating capacity of the arena is 10,400 spectators.

Built for the 2010 FIBA World Championship, the new venue replaced the nearby Ankara Atatürk Sport Hall as the home of Turkish Basketball League clubs, Hacettepe Üniversitesi, Türk Telekom Basketbol and Optimum TED Ankara Kolejliler.

In 2011, the arena hosted along with the Başkent Volleyball Hall the FIVB Girls Youth World Championship.

Matches of the 2012 FIBA World Olympic Qualifying Tournament for Women were played at the arena between June 25-July 1.

International events
2015 FIVB Volleyball Women's U23 World Championship 12–19 August 2015

Concerts
Tarkan performed at the arena on November 6, 2010.

Inna performed as part of her INNA en Concert Tour on May 26, 2011.

Elton John performed as part of his Greatest Hits Tour on July 6, 2011.

See also
List of indoor arenas in Turkey

References

External links

Venue information
FIBA - FIBA ends inspection tour in Turkey for 2010 FIBA World Championship
Construction Cost
Construction Design-Animation

Sports venues in Ankara
Sports venues completed in 2010
Basketball venues in Turkey
Volleyball venues in Turkey
Turkish Basketball League venues
Music venues in Turkey
Badminton venues
Türk Telekom BK
2010 establishments in Turkey